Rebecca Chan Hoi-yan (born 19 November 1977) is a member of the Legislative Council of Hong Kong. A former journalist, Chan was the political assistant to Secretary for Food and Health Ko Wing-man from 2012 to 2017. As a health ambassador, she stood in the 2018 November Kowloon West by-election and was elected, defeating pro-democrat candidate Lee Cheuk-yan. Chan is also a musician and vocalist.

Early career
Chan graduated from the Department of Journalism at Hong Kong Baptist University and went on to obtain a Master of Social Sciences Degree in Media Management, also from Baptist University. She received the university's Distinguished Alumni Communicator Award in 2008.

She joined TVB as a news reporter in 1998 and became a senior reporter and anchor. In 2005, she moved to Now TV as a news editor (news and business information) and assisted in setting up the now business news channel and the news channel. She was also an executive producer of the medical programme Medicine Online.

From December 2012 until the end of his tenure on 1 July 2017, she was political assistant to Secretary for Food and Health Ko Wing-man. She became CEO of social enterprise Sounds Great Services after she left the government.

2018 Legislative Council by-election
She became candidate in the 2018 November Kowloon West by-election after Ko declined to run and endorsed Chan in his place. Relatively unknown to the public before, she benefitted from the popularity of her former boss and the resources of the pro-Beijing camp, although she denied being a pro-Beijing candidate until in the late stage of the campaign. As a result, she received 106,457 votes, 13,410 more than veteran pro-democrat candidate Lee Cheuk-yan of the Labour Party, being the second candidate to beat a pro-democrat in a geographical constituency direct election after Vincent Cheng of the Democratic Alliance for the Betterment and Progress of Hong Kong (DAB) in the March by-election in the same constituency.

In the run-up to the election, one of her campaign leaflets was found to contain material plagiarised from work by Kenny Lai Kwong Wai, a Democratic Party Kowloon City District Councillor, urging a review of tourism laws. She apologised for the inclusion, with her office claiming it was a production error. Other pro-Beijing district councillors also used the plagiarised material, including Chan's DAB colleague Luk King-kwong and Lam Pok of Kowloon West New Dynamic.

She was unseated as her election was voided by court in September 2020 due to irregularities, on the petition of Lau Siu-lai.

Legislative Council member 
In September 2022, Chan said that the government should be conservative with relaxing COVID-19 measures and should not reduce current anti-epidemic measures despite a drop in cases. Chan expressed support for continuing overnight lockdowns and mandatory testing requirements. In contrast, a top Hong Kong microbiologist said that the government should stop mandatory testing requirements at residences.

References

1977 births
Living people
Alumni of Hong Kong Baptist University
Hong Kong journalists
Government officials of Hong Kong
HK LegCo Members 2016–2021
HK LegCo Members 2022–2025
Hong Kong pro-Beijing politicians
Members of the Election Committee of Hong Kong, 2021–2026
Copyright infringement